The Terraba Basin Group is a geologic group in Costa Rica. It preserves fossils dating back to the Neogene period.

See also

 List of fossiliferous stratigraphic units in Costa Rica

References
 

Geologic groups of North America
Neogene Costa Rica
Geologic formations of Costa Rica